Hsu Chi-chieh (born 27 April 1988 in San Francisco) is a Taiwanese swimmer.

Hsu represented Chinese Taipei at the Summer Olympics in 2008 and 2012. In 2008, he competed in the men's 200 metre butterfly. He won his heat, finished in 16th place overall in the heats, and qualified for the semifinals. In his semifinal, he finished 8th and failed to qualify for the final. In 2012, he again competed in the men's 200 metre butterfly. He finished in 30th place overall in the heats, failing to qualify for the semifinals.

Hsu is the son of Taiwanese Olympic swimmer Hsu Tung-hsiung. He married his middle-school classmate Chen Chun-hung in January 2016.

References

1988 births
Living people
Taiwanese male swimmers
Olympic swimmers of Taiwan
Swimmers at the 2008 Summer Olympics
Swimmers at the 2012 Summer Olympics
Male butterfly swimmers
Swimmers at the 2006 Asian Games
Swimmers at the 2010 Asian Games
Swimmers at the 2014 Asian Games
American emigrants to Taiwan
American people of Taiwanese descent
Asian Games competitors for Chinese Taipei